The Caetano Alpha was a design of coach bodywork built by Salvador Caetano of Portugal between 1976 and 1983.

History

Released in late 1976, the Caetano Alpha was intended to become the flagship model of the coachbuilder's offerings, replacing the Estoril coach model. The Alpha had a more streamlined design than the Estoril, but still conservative.

In late 1977, by the time Estoril was discontinued, a heavily revamped version of the Alpha is presented, Alpha 77, with design motifs new to the Portuguese coachbuilding scene, such as windows with square corners and thin pillars covered by black frames.

The styling introduced by 77 version became a success and got facelifted in late 1978 with totally renewed front and back sections, version known as Alpha 79. The same version started to be imported into the UK, initially by Moseley of Loughborough and was badged as "Moseley Continental", as happened with its predecessor, the Estoril.

The model would receive another two facelifts, Alpha 80, by the end of 1979, with very few differences from 79 and by 1981, Alpha 81, that introduced the two stripes front topping design and front turning and position lamps moved from the panel under the windshield to the side of the headlamps.

In 1979, a version of Magirus-Deutz R81 midibus with Alpha 77 design, named Alphete, was introduced.

In Portugal, this was a widely popular coach, being a very representative model on Rodoviária Nacional fleet, with 158 coaches delivered, plus 5 Alphete, as well as 18 bought second hand, becoming a symbol of their express services in the whole decade of the '80s. Several coaches were also supplied to private touring operators.

In the final year of production of the Alpha, 1983, Salvador Caetano would launch two new coaches, the Coral to celebrate company's 35 years of activity and, later that year, the effective replacement of the Alpha, the Beta.

Technical details

In 1970, Salvador Caetano and Magirus-Deutz AG signed a partnership agreement in order to produce integral buses, this agreement had a somewhat slow start as Volvo B58 kept being a much more common choice for Salvador Caerano costumers. The Alpha, in fact, assured the success of the technical partnership as most of the coaches built were based on Magirus-Deutz mechanics.

Both 232 and 256 PS Deutz V8 air-cooled engines were installed, but, in the final years of production, integral coaches could be also specified with Type 370 water-cooled Iveco engines, commonly badged as Iveco-Magirus. Chassised versions of diverse manufactures were also offered and the coaches could be ordered with Pegaso, Volvo and Scania mechanics. Alphete was powered by 130 PS Deutz type F6L913, 6.1 L straight-6 air-cooled engines.

The seating capacity was typically of 49 to 53 seats, but lower specification 55 seat coaches were also built, as well as higher specification with less than 49 seats.

High-deck coaches were a possible choice on 81 models, most of these were Pegaso engined.

Chassis and model codes

Portugal
 Magirus-Deutz - LCAnn (Original and 77); LCBnn (79 and 80); TCBnn (81)
 260 C 120 (Original and 77)
 230 E 113 (79-81)
 260 E 113 (79-81)
 130 R 81 (Alphete)
 170 E 100 (10 m version)
 Iveco 
 Type 370 water-cooled engines on later coaches, commonly badged as Iveco-Magirus
 Pegaso - TPAnn (79-80); LPBnn (81)
 5035
 5036 
 Scania - LSAnn (79-80); TSBnn (81) 
 BR145
 BR116
 Volvo - TLVAnn (Original and 77); TLVBnn (from 79)
 B58
 B10M

nn=number of seats

UK
 Bedford 
 YMT
 DAF 
 MB
 Ford
 Ford R1114
 Volvo
 B58
 B10M

See also

 List of buses

External links

Coaches (bus)
Vehicles introduced in 1976